Miss Sulaymaniyah is part of an official national beauty pageant of Iraq and the only pageant recognized by the Ministry of Culture of the Republic of Iraq. The contest will be held annually in Baghdad, the capital of Iraq.

Rayan Ali - 2021-2022 
Rayan Ali Abdalla (Arabic: ریان علی عبدللە; born October 13, 1999) is an Beauty Pageant who won the “Miss Sulaymaniyah 2021” beauty pageant and was a Doctor from southern Kurdistan she was crowned as Miss Sulaymaniyah in 2021, she is one of the candidates for Miss Kurdistan. Rayan is from Sulaymaniyah, She holds a bachelor in veterinary training. Professionals from the University of Sulaymaniyah.

References 

Beauty pageants in Iraq
Entertainment events in Iraq